Timothy Gorzeński (1743–1825) was a Polish Bishop of the Roman Catholic Church. He was Bishop of Poznań from 1809–1825,  Archbishop of Gniezno and Primate of Poland from 1821–1825.

Early life
He was born into the Nałęcz noble family on   March 20, 1743 in Dobrzyca His parents Francis and Anna were owners of the Dobrzyckich estate at Deręgowskich.

In 1765 he began theological studies at the Seminary of the Missionin Kraków and in 1763, with the Pontifical commissions, he became Canon at the Poznań Cathedral, and in 1776 a Canon at the Cathedral of Kraków.  He was also at this time Rector of St. Michael's Hospice, Kraków. In 1775 he went to Rome, where he studied law returning to Poznań in 1777, and later back to Kraków.

Career
In 1780 he moved to Warsaw as a delegate of the Kraków Curia to the main Court of the Crown. A year later he received the Order of Saint Stanislaus and the position of clerk of the Holy Crown. Beginning in 1788, he served as Chancellor of the Duchy of Severian, as it turned out as the last. In 1790 he was the nominal Bishop of Smolensk Oblast.

He was a member of the Confederation of the four-year Sejm where he pushed for the introduction of the Constitution of the 3rd May. After the Third Partition of Poland he returned to Kraków then briefly resided in Vienna, and in 1804 he moved again to Poznań. Where Frederick William III appointed him Bishop of Poznań in 1806, but the Napoleonic Wars prevented his induction until 1808. In 1810 he began work on establishing the Poznań University.

Primacy
In 1821 Pope Pius VII raised the bishopric of Poznań to merge with the metropolis of Gnieźnieńską in a personal union based in Poznań and Gorzeński became primate, although in 1822 Friedrich Wilhelm III forbade him to use the title. As Archbishop at the Cathedral of Poznań he brought many vestments, crockery, furniture, and other valuables. He founded the Church of St. Timothy in Białężynie.

In 1785 was made a Knight in the Prussian Order of the Red Eagle.

He died on December 20, 1825 in Poznań. After his death, was buried in Poznań Cathedral, in the chapel of Szołdrskich, where his ashes were moved to the crypt. His heart according to his will and testament is in the basement of Gniezno Cathedral.

References

External links

 Virtual tour Gniezno Cathedral 
List of Primates of Poland 

1743 births
1825 deaths
18th-century Polish nobility
Bishops of Poznań
Archbishops of Gniezno
Bishops of Smolensk
Catholic clergy of the Prussian partition
19th-century Polish nobility